Karl George Johnston (born 26 February 1979 in Whitby, North Yorkshire) is an English bobsledder who competed for Great Britain at the 2006 Winter Olympics.

At the 2006 Winter Olympics held in Turin, Italy, Johnston competed in the men's four-man bobsleigh in a team that included his brother Lee Johnston. The British team finished in 17th position.

References

1979 births
Bobsledders at the 2006 Winter Olympics
English male bobsledders
Living people
Olympic bobsledders of Great Britain
People from Whitby
Sportspeople from Yorkshire